Sasovka 2-ya is a rural locality (a khutor) in Kolbinskoye Rural Settlement, Repyovsky District, Voronezh Oblast, Russia. The population was 64 as of 2010.

Geography 
Sasovka 2-ya is located 26 km east of Repyovka (the district's administrative centre) by road. Kolbino is the nearest rural locality.

References 

Rural localities in Repyovsky District